Main Range  may mean:
 Main Range National Park, Queensland, Australia
 Main Range (Snowy Mountains), New South Wales, Australia

See also
 Main Ranges, also known as the Park Ranges, a group of mountain ranges in the Canadian Rockies